Narendra chaudhary (nicknamed "Steel Man") (1968 - 12 May 2016), was an Indian army Bomb defusing expert, who had defused more than over 256 bombs in his career.

Native place
He belonged to a small village Bader,  in Nagaur district of Rajasthan. He joined Indian army early in his young age and was serving the nation till he demised on his duty, defusing another bomb.

Achievement
In his career, he defused more than 256 bombs, thus saving thousands of lives in Naxal affected areas, which are heavily mined by Naxalites. He used to walk over 50 km without water or food in the difficult terrain of central India, never in his career got ill, his friends used to call him "Steel Man" (સ્ટીલ મેન).

Personality
When asked about weakness of Narendra Chaudhary, the Jawans said "He had only one weakness- a cup of tea". Narendra Singh was so fearless that when it come to diffuse bombs he keep whole team away from bomb and himself took risks. Because of his such abilities he was always in Hit list of Naxalites.

References

External links
 Narendra Chaudhary Who Diffused 256 Bombs Alone Is No More Alive

People from Pali district
Bomb disposal personnel
Indian Army personnel